Robert Whitworth (5 July 1914 – 30 December 2002) was a Scotland international rugby union player. He played at the Wing position.

Rugby Union career

Amateur career

Whitworth played for London Scottish.

International career

Whitworth was capped by Scotland for just one match. This was the Five Nations match against Ireland at Murrayfield Stadium on 22 February 1936. Ireland won the match 10 - 4.

Despite the defeat, Whitworth acquitted himself well in the match and was noted by The Glasgow Herald as having 'useful runs' throughout.

References

1914 births
2002 deaths
Scottish rugby union players
London Scottish F.C. players
Scotland international rugby union players
Rugby union wings